The Land Before Time XIII: The Wisdom of Friends is a 2007 direct-to-video animated film and the thirteenth film in The Land Before Time series.

Plot 
Littlefoot has been having nightmares of Grandma Longneck falling to her death, which almost occurred during an earthquake, but Grandma Longneck luckily saved herself before she fell. Grandma Longneck comforts and teaches Littlefoot important life lessons called "Wisdoms". Later on, Littlefoot, Cera, Ducky, Spike, and Petrie meet three yellow-bellied dinosaurs, Loofah, Doofah, and Foobie. They have lost their way while traveling to distant Berry Valley. Loofah, Doofah, and Foobie seem to be too unintelligent to find their way back, so Littlefoot and the others decide to help their new friends whilst sharing Wisdoms along the way.

During the trip, Littlefoot and his friends have been pursued by a quartet of Sharpteeth, led by a Sharptooth with a scar that goes around his head. They made it to a Watering Hole and meet other yellow bellies. Earlier, Loofah mentioned a so-called "wise one" among the Yellow Bellies but Littlefoot cannot find no sign of him. Littlefoot begins to lead the Yellow Bellies across the Mysterious Beyond to reach the Berry Valley, however, Littlefoot has never been to Berry Valley and worries that he might make unwise decisions while he came to teach the Yellow Bellies how to be wise. His friends reassure him that he should trust in his feelings to let him know what to listen to.

As an intense storm occurs, Littlefoot leads the Yellow Bellies onto a plateau for shelter, but Doofah becomes separated from the group, going the wrong direction. Once the storm ends, Littlefoot and his friends were able to find her and she rejoins the group. The Sharpteeth attack again, but they were able to defeat them when the Yellow Bellies bounced up and down. After the Sharpteeth were defeated, they finally made it to Berry Valley. Foobie is revealed to be the "Wise One" all along. Littlefoot and his friends reunite with their family and they return to the Great Valley.

Voice cast

John Ingle as Narrator/Topsy
Cody Arens/Logan Arens as Littlefoot
Anthony Skillman as Littlefoot (singing)
Anndi McAfee as Cera
Aria Curzon as Ducky
Jeff Bennett as Petrie
Rob Paulsen as Spike/Beipiaosaurus #4
Cuba Gooding Jr. as Loofah
Sandra Oh as Doofah
Jessica Gee as Tria
Miriam Flynn as Grandma Longneck
Pete Sepenuk as Foobie

Music
The music was composed by Michael Tavera and the new songs were written by Michele Brourman and Amanda McBroom.

This was the third film in the series without James Horner's original score from the first film; the first two were The Land Before Time X: The Great Longneck Migration and The Land Before Time XII: The Great Day of the Flyers, although Michael Tavera's older themes from previous sequels can still be heard.

Production
The film was revealed on the official Land Before Time website seen in a trailer.

Almost every sequel is highlighted by a celebrity guest voice; in the case of this film, they are Academy Award winner Cuba Gooding Jr. and Sandra Oh of Grey's Anatomy.

The same production team remains, although this marks the debut of Jamie Mitchell, who replaces Charles Grosvenor as director. Therefore, Grosvenor is credited as a supervising director.

Release date
The film was released on DVD on November 27, 2007 with the TV series's episode, "The Hidden Canyon", included as a bonus feature.

Reception
The Wisdom of Friends received a nomination for "Best Feature Film, Ages 5-8" at the 2008 Kids First! Film Festival, losing to Barbie & the Diamond Castle.

References

External links

Official website

2007 direct-to-video films
2007 animated films
2007 films
Universal Animation Studios animated films
Direct-to-video sequel films
The Land Before Time films
Universal Pictures direct-to-video animated films
2000s American animated films
Animated films about dinosaurs
Films directed by Jamie Mitchell (director)
2000s English-language films
Films scored by Michael Tavera